The Armies of Tékumel is a series of miniatures wargame army supplements, written by M. A. R. Barker for the fantasy world of Tékumel, and published between 1978 and 1998. Designed for use with the EPT miniatures rules Qadardalikoi.

History
The six volumes are:
 The Armies of Tékumel, Volume I: Tsolyánu, M. A. R. Barker, published 1978, 1981, 1997. 
 The Armies of Tékumel, Volume II: Yan Kor and Allies, M. A. R. Barker, 1981, 1997. 
 The Armies of Tékumel, Volume III: Mu'ugalavyá, M. A. R. Barker, 1983, 1997.
 The Armies of Tékumel, Volume IV: Salarvya, M. A. R. Barker, 1983, 1997.
 The Armies of Tékumel, Volume V: Livyanu and Tsolei, M. A. R. Barker, 1983, 1997. 
 The Armies of Tékumel, Volume VI: Shenyu, M. A. R. Barker & Robert Brynildson, 1998.

Reception
Frederick Paul Kiesche III reviewed The Armies of Tékumel in Space Gamer No. 71. Kiesche commented that "This can be a useful item if you're willing to dig out the information for RPG scenarios.  Otherwise, you can probably skip it and your campaign will be just as exciting.  Definitely a 'look before buying' item."

See also
 Legions of the Petal Throne, a 1975 Tékumel miniatures wargame
 Qadardalikoi, a 1983 Tékumel miniatures wargame

References

External links

Miniature wargames
Tékumel